Shannonvale is a community in Restigouche County, New Brunswick, Canada. It is part of the village of Eel River Crossing.

History

Notable people

See also
List of neighbourhoods in New Brunswick

References
 

Neighbourhoods in New Brunswick